Funk You! is an album by organist Don Patterson recorded in 1968 and released on the Prestige label.

Reception

Allmusic awarded the album 3 stars stating "as 1960s jazz with organ goes, this is pretty straight-ahead and boppish, rather than soul-jazz".

Track listing 
All compositions by Don Patterson except as indicated
 "Ratio and Proportion" (Sonny Stitt) – 4:53
 "Airegin" (Sonny Rollins) – 4:31
 "Little Angie" – 6:14
 "My Man String" – 4:43
 "Funk in 3/4" – 5:23
 "It's You or No One" (Sammy Cahn, Jule Styne) – 6:03

Personnel 
 Don Patterson – organ
 Charles McPherson – alto saxophone
 Sonny Stitt – alto saxophone, tenor saxophone
 Pat Martino – guitar
 Billy James – drums

References 

Don Patterson (organist) albums
1969 albums
Prestige Records albums
Albums produced by Don Schlitten